Topsy-Turvy is a 1999 British musical period drama film written and directed by Mike Leigh, starring Allan Corduner as Sir Arthur Sullivan and Jim Broadbent as W.S. Gilbert, along with Timothy Spall, Lesley Manville and Ron Cook. The story concerns the 15-month period in 1884 and 1885 leading up to the premiere of Gilbert and Sullivan's The Mikado. The film focuses on the creative conflict between playwright and composer, and their decision to continue their partnership, which led to their creation of several more Savoy operas.

The film received very favourable reviews, film festival awards and two Academy Awards for design. While it is considered an artistic success as an in-depth illustration of British life in the theatre during the Victorian era, the film did not recover its production costs. Leigh cast actors who did their own singing in the film, and the singing performances were faulted by some critics, while others lauded Leigh's strategy.

Plot
On the opening night of Princess Ida at the Savoy Theatre in January 1884, composer Sir Arthur Sullivan (Allan Corduner), ill from kidney disease, is barely able to make it to the theatre to conduct. He goes on a holiday to Continental Europe hoping that the rest will improve his health. While he is away, ticket sales and audiences at the Savoy Theatre wilt in the hot summer weather. Producer Richard D'Oyly Carte (Ron Cook) has called on Sullivan and the dramatist W.S. Gilbert (Jim Broadbent) to create a new piece for the Savoy, but it is not ready when Ida closes. Until a new piece can be prepared, Carte revives an earlier Gilbert and Sullivan work, The Sorcerer.

Gilbert's idea for their next opera features a transformative magic potion, which Sullivan feels is too similar to the magic lozenge and other magic talismans used in previous operas and mechanical in its reliance on a supernatural device. Sullivan, under pressure from the British musical establishment to write more serious music, says he longs for something that is "probable", involves "human interest", and is not dependent on magic. Gilbert sees nothing wrong with his libretto and refuses to write a new one, resulting in a standoff. The impasse is resolved after Gilbert and his wife visit a popular exhibition of Japanese arts and crafts in Knightsbridge, London. When the katana sword he purchases there falls noisily off the wall of his study, he is inspired to write a libretto set in exotic Japan. Sullivan likes the idea and agrees to compose the music for it.

Gilbert, Sullivan and Carte work to make The Mikado a success, and many glimpses of rehearsals and stressful backstage preparations for the show follow: Cast members lunch together before attempting to negotiate their salaries. Gilbert brings in Japanese girls from the exhibition to teach the ladies' chorus how to walk and use fans in the Japanese manner. The principal cast react to the fittings of their costumes designed by C. Wilhelm. The cast objects to Gilbert's proposed cut of the title character's Act Two solo, "A more humane Mikado," persuading the playwright to restore it. The actors face first-night jitters in their dressing rooms. Finally The Mikado is ready to open. As is usual for him, Gilbert is too nervous to watch the opening performance and paces the streets of London. Returning to the theatre, he finds that the new opera is a resounding success.

Cast

 Jim Broadbent as W. S. Gilbert
 Allan Corduner as Sir Arthur Sullivan
 Lesley Manville as Lucy "Kitty" Gilbert, Gilbert's wife
 Ron Cook as Richard D'Oyly Carte, owner of the Savoy Theatre
 Eleanor David as the American socialite Fanny Ronalds, Sullivan's mistress
 Wendy Nottingham as Helen Lenoir, Carte's indispensable business manager
 Timothy Spall as Richard Temple, who plays the Mikado
 Vincent Franklin as Rutland Barrington, who plays Pooh-Bah
 Martin Savage as George Grossmith, who plays Ko-Ko
 Dexter Fletcher as Louis, Sullivan's valet
 Dorothy Atkinson as Jessie Bond, who plays Pitti-Sing
 Shirley Henderson as Leonora Braham, who plays Yum-Yum
 Kevin McKidd as Durward Lely, who plays Nanki-Poo
 Louise Gold as Rosina Brandram, who plays Katisha
 Cathy Sara as Sybil Grey, who plays Peep-Bo
 Michael Simkins as Frederick Bovill, who plays Pish-Tush
 Andy Serkis as John D'Auban, choreographer
 Nicholas Woodeson as Mr. Seymour
 Naoko Mori as Miss "Sixpence Please", a tea seller at the Japanese Village, Knightsbridge
 Sukie Smith as Clothilde, Sullivan's maid
 Kenneth Hadley as Mr. Pidgeon, Gilbert's butler
 Kate Doherty as Mrs. Judd, Gilbert's house-keeper and cook
 Keeley Gainey as Gilbert's maid
 Charles Simon as Mr. William Gilbert, Gilbert's father
 Theresa Watson as Maude Gilbert, Gilbert's youngest sister
 Lavinia Bertram as Florence Gilbert, Gilbert's middle sister
 Eve Pierce as Mrs. Anne Gilbert, Gilbert's mother
 Ashley Jensen as Miss Tringham, a member of the chorus
 Mark Benton as Mr. Price, a member of the chorus
 Steve Speirs as Mr. Kent, a member of the chorus
 Nicholas Boulton as Mr. Conyngham, a member of the chorus
 Sam Kelly as Richard Barker, the stage manager
 Jonathan Aris as C. Wilhelm, the costumer designer
 Alison Steadman as Madame Leon, the wardrobe mistress
 William Neenan as Cook, Grossmith's attendant
 Adam Searles as Shrimp, backstage messenger-boy
 Katrin Cartlidge as the madame of a Paris brothel
 Julia Rayner as Mademoiselle Fromage, a singing prostitute at the brothel
 Bríd Brennan as a mad beggar woman

Depiction of Victorian society

Film professor Wheeler Winston Dixon wrote that the film "uses the conventions of the biographical narrative film to expose the ruthlessness and insularity of the Victorian era, at the same time as it chronicles, with great fidelity, the difficulties of a working relationship in the creative arts. ... Topsy-Turvy is an investigation into the social, political, sexual and theatrical economies of the Victorian era".

While the film deals primarily with the production of The Mikado, it depicts many aspects of 1880s British life and society, some based on historical episodes. Scenes show George Grossmith's use of morphine; Leonora Braham's alcoholism and single motherhood; Jessie Bond's health issues, including an abscess on her leg that does not heal; Sullivan's visit to a French brothel and his relationship with his longtime mistress, Fanny Ronalds, implying that she obtains an abortion; three actors' discussion of the destruction of the British garrison at Khartoum by the Mahdi; a private salon concert; a conversation about the use of nicotine by women; and Gilbert being accosted outside the theatre on opening night by an elderly prostitute. The film also depicts the Savoy Theatre as having electric lighting; it was the first public building in Britain, and one of the first of any kind, to be lit entirely by electricity. Another scene shows an early use of the telephone. During costume fittings, the actors protest at having to perform without their corsets for the sake of accuracy.

Production
Principal photography took place at 3 Mills Studios in London beginning 29 June 1998 and completed shooting on 24 October. Location shooting took place in London and Hertfordshire, and scenes which took place at the Savoy Theatre were filmed at the Richmond Theatre in Richmond, London. The film's budget was $20,000,000.

Release

Box office
In the United Kingdom, the film grossed £610,634 in total and £139,700 on its opening weekend. In the United States, the film grossed $6,208,548 in total, and $31,387 on its opening weekend.

Critical reception
The film received very positive reviews from critics. On Rotten Tomatoes, the film has a 90% "Fresh" score based on 88 reviews, with an average rating of 7.8/10. The site's consensus states: "Dressed to the nines in exquisite production value and buoyed by Mike Leigh's sardonic wit, Topsy-Turvy is rich entertainment that is as brainy as it is handsome." Metacritic reports a 90 out of 100 rating based on 31 critics, indicating "universal acclaim".

Janet Maslin of The New York Times found Topsy-Turvy "grandly entertaining", "one of those films that create a mix of erudition, pageantry and delectable acting opportunities, much as Shakespeare in Love did". She continued:
Topsy-Turvy ... is much bigger than their story. Its aspirations are thrilling in their own right. Mr. Leigh's gratifyingly long view of life in the theatre (Gilbert has a dentist who tells him Princess Ida could have been shorter) includes not only historical and biographical details but also the painstaking process of creating a Gilbert and Sullivan production from the ground up. The film details all this with the luxury of a leisurely pace, as opposed to a slow one.

Richard Schickel in Time magazine described the film as "one of the year's more beguiling surprises" and a "somewhat comic, somewhat desperate, very carefully detailed" story given "heartfelt heft" in the way it depicts how rehearsing and putting on a comic opera "takes over everyone's life". According to Philip French in The Observer, "Topsy-Turvy is not a conventional biographical film. ... [It] is an opulently mounted, warm-hearted celebration of two great artists and of a dedicated group of actors, backstage personnel and front-of-house figures working together."  French also calls the film "a rare treat, thanks to Dick Pope's photography, Eve Stewart's production design and Lindy Hemming's costumes", with "great music orchestrated by Carl Davis." For Roger Ebert, it was "one of the year's best films."

Topsy-Turvy ranks 481st on Empires 2008 list of the 500 greatest films of all time.

Awards and honours
At the 72nd Academy Awards, Topsy-Turvy received the Academy Award for Best Costume Design and the Academy Award for Best Makeup, and was nominated for Best Art Direction and Best Original Screenplay.

The film also won Best Make Up/Hair at the 53rd British Academy Film Awards and was nominated for Best British Film, Best Actor in a Leading Role (Jim Broadbent), Best Supporting Actor (Timothy Spall) and Best Original Screenplay. Broadbent also won the Volpi Cup for Best Actor at the 56th Venice International Film Festival, and the film was nominated for the Golden Lion at the same festival.

Topsy-Turvy won the Best British Film Award at the Evening Standard British Film Awards, Best Film (shared with Spike Jonze's Being John Malkovich) and Best Director at the 1999 National Society of Film Critics Awards, and Best Picture and Best Director at the 1999 New York Film Critics Circle Awards.

Home media
A digitally restored version of the film, released on DVD and Blu-ray by The Criterion Collection in March 2011, includes an audio commentary featuring director Leigh; a new video conversation between Leigh and musical director Gary Yershon; Leigh's 1992 short film A Sense of History, written by and starring actor Jim Broadbent; deleted scenes; and a featurette from 1999 including interviews with Leigh and cast members.

See also
 The Story of Gilbert and Sullivan
 Topsyturveydom

Notes

References

Further reading

External links
 
 "Mike Leigh on Topsy Turvy: 'I wouldn't direct a Gilbert and Sullivan opera'", The Guardian (1999)
Topsy-Turvy: Great Performances, an essay by Amy Taubin at the Criterion Collection

1999 films
1990s biographical drama films
British biographical drama films
British musical drama films
Films about composers
Films about opera
Films directed by Mike Leigh
Films set in London
Films set in the Victorian era
Films set in the 1880s
Films that won the Academy Award for Best Makeup
Films that won the Best Costume Design Academy Award
1990s musical drama films
Works about Gilbert and Sullivan
BAFTA winners (films)
1999 drama films
National Society of Film Critics Award for Best Film winners
Films set in the 19th century
1990s English-language films
1990s British films